Pazmiño Arregui Mireya Katerine is an Ecuadorian politician representing the province of Bolivar in the National Assembly. She is a member of the Pachakutik Plurinational Unity Movement – New Country party who has been an independent.

Life 
She took her first degree at the Universidad Técnica Particular de Loja in 2004. She qualified a lawyer at the same institution in 2012 and she gained her masters there in 2015.

In 2017 and 2018 she was teaching at the State University of Bolívar.

In 2021 she was elected to represent the province of Bolivar in Ecuador's National Assembly. She was a member of the Pachakutik Plurinational Unity Movement – New Country party. She was expelled from the party but she was returned by a vote in June 2021 when the expulsion was revoked.

She is the President of the Economic Regime Commission.

On 1 April 2022 she was thrown out of the Pachakutik Plurinational Unity Movement – New Country party for contempt, not attending meetings, having agendas and not supporting the party's policies. The others excluded were Mario Ruíz, Patricia Sánchez, Fernando Cabascango, Darwin Pereira and Peter Calo.

In June Pazmiño led a proposal to repeal a Presidential decree that had declared "a state of emergency" in the province of Pichincha and the provinces of Cotopaxi and Imbabura. Her proposal was supported by 71 other assembly members. Leonidas Iza who leads the Confederation of Indigenous Nationalities of Ecuador and other parties involved with the national strike would be invited to the debate.

On the 12 July 2022 she presented a draft Organic Law to the National Assembly. Its purpose was to improve the Organic Monetary and Financial Code to encourage foreign competition in the national financial system.

References 

Living people
Members of the National Assembly (Ecuador)
Women members of the National Assembly (Ecuador)
People from Bolívar Province (Ecuador)
Year of birth missing (living people)
21st-century Ecuadorian women politicians
21st-century Ecuadorian politicians